Musik, dans & party 6 is a 1991 studio album by Sten & Stanley.

Track listing
"På en öde ö i havet" (T. Varnick - N. Acquaviva - E. Sandström)
"Spar dina tårar" (R-M. Stråhle)
"Åh, stackars mej" ("Oh Lonesome Me") (D. Gibson - H. Nilsson)
"Fristen" (M. Wiehe)
"Jambalaya (On the Bayou)" (H. Williams)
"Om och om igen" (U. Nordqvist - A. Gunnarsson)
"Säg är det kärlek" (S. Nilsson - M. Forsberg)
"Där björkarna susa" (O. Merikano - V. Sund)
"Varje dag" (E. Lihm - P. Hermansson)
"En gyllene ring" (L. Sandberg)
"Spara sista dansen för mej" ("Save the Last Dance for Me") (D. Pomus - M. Shuman - M. Åkerlund)
"Jag har aldrig lovat dig en himmel" (S. Nilsson - M. Forsberg)
"Mitt bästa för dig" (P. Rogefeldt)
"Framtidstro" (U. Nordquist - U. Nordquist - S. Nilsson)
"Bye Bye Love" (F. Bryant - B. Bryant - K. Almgren)
"För varje dag som går" (J. Frankfurter - I. Holder - M. Forsberg)

Charts

References 

1991 albums
Sten & Stanley albums